Humphrey Edward Gregory Atkins, Baron Colnbrook,  (12 August 1922 – 4 October 1996) was a British politician and a member of the Conservative Party. He served for 32 years as a Member of Parliament (MP), and served in the Cabinet of Prime Minister Margaret Thatcher from 1979 to 1982.

Early life 
Atkins was born on 12 August 1922, in Chalfont St Peter, Buckinghamshire, son of Captain Edward Davis Atkins and Violet Mary and lived in Kenya until the age of three. He and his wife Margaret (née Spencer-Nairn, 1924–2012) had four children, three daughters and one son.

Atkins was educated at Wellington College, Berkshire, and served in the Royal Navy from 1940 to 1948. He worked for Nairn's, his wife's family's linoleum business in Kirkcaldy, Scotland, then became a director of a financial advertising agency.

Political career
Atkins contested the constituency of West Lothian in 1951, and was elected as a Member of Parliament (MP) for Merton and Morden in 1955. He became MP for Spelthorne in 1970.

Atkins was the Conservative Chief Whip from 1973 to 1979, and served as a Secretary of State for Northern Ireland from 1979 to 1981. In September 1981, he was appointed as Lord Privy Seal, which was a role as the chief government spokesman in the House of Commons for Foreign and Commonwealth Affairs. This role was necessary because the Foreign Secretary, Lord Carrington, sat in the House of Lords. He resigned in April 1982, along with Lord Carrington, over the Falklands invasion. Atkins was appointed to the Order of St Michael and St George as a Knight Commander (KCMG) in the 1983 Dissolution Honours. He left the House of Commons in 1987 and was created a life peer on 16 October as Baron Colnbrook ''of Waltham St Lawrence in the Royal County of Berkshire.

Death
Atkins died from cancer on 4 October 1996 at the age of 74 in Waltham St Lawrence, Berkshire.

References

External links 
 

|-

|-

|-

|-

|-

|-

1922 births
1996 deaths
Conservative Party (UK) MPs for English constituencies
Conservative Party (UK) life peers
Royal Navy personnel of World War II
Knights Commander of the Order of St Michael and St George
British Secretaries of State
Secretaries of State for Northern Ireland
Lords Privy Seal
People educated at Wellington College, Berkshire
Members of the Privy Council of the United Kingdom
Borough of Spelthorne
Treasurers of the Household
UK MPs 1955–1959
UK MPs 1959–1964
UK MPs 1964–1966
UK MPs 1966–1970
UK MPs 1970–1974
UK MPs 1974
UK MPs 1974–1979
UK MPs 1979–1983
UK MPs 1983–1987
Royal Navy personnel
Military personnel from Buckinghamshire
Deaths from cancer in England
People from Waltham St Lawrence
Life peers created by Elizabeth II